IALA can stand for:

International Association for Learning Alternatives
International Association of Lighthouse Authorities (International Association of Marine Aids to Navigation and Lighthouse Authorities)
International Auxiliary Language Association
Industrial Area Local Authority